Mission Bell may refer to:

Music

Albums
 The Mission Bell, a 2005 album by Delirious?
 Mission Bell (Everly album), 2008
 Mission Bell (Amos Lee album), 2011

Songs
 "Mission Bell" (Donnie Brooks song), 1960
 "Mission Bell" (Stan Ridgway song), 1999

Other 
 Mission bell markers, marking the route between California Missions
 Fritillaria or mission bells, a type of lily